8W or 8-W may refer to:

Units of measurement 
8°W, or 8th meridian west, a longitude coordinate
8 watts, a derived unit of power
8 weeks
8 wins, abbreviated in a Win–loss record

Transportation

Aviation 
8W, ex-IATA code for BAX Global (defunct airline)
8W, IATA code for Fly All Ways
Spartan 8W Zeus, a military aircraft
B-8W, a model of Bensen B-8

Rail transport 
8w (locomotive), a type of locomotive under the Whyte notation
B40-8W, a model of GE Dash 8-40BW locomotive
C40-8W, a model of GE Dash 8-40CW locomotive
C44-8W, a model of GE Dash 8-44CW locomotive

Other 
Tropical Depression 8W, part of the 1979 Pacific typhoon season

See also 
W8 (disambiguation)